Bağbanlı is a village and municipality in the Quba District of Azerbaijan. It has a population of 1,562.

Climate 
This region of Azerbaijan has a temperate climate..The temperature of Baghbanly is 12.0 °C on average. August is typically the warmest month.

References

Populated places in Quba District (Azerbaijan)